Royal Air Force St. Eval or RAF St. Eval was a Royal Air Force station for the RAF Coastal Command, southwest of Padstow in Cornwall, England, UK. St Eval's primary role was to provide anti-submarine and anti-shipping patrols off the south west coast. Aircraft from the airfield were also used for photographic reconnaissance missions, meteorological flights, convoy patrols, air-sea rescue missions and protection of the airfield from the Luftwaffe.

History

The construction of the station
The Royal Air Force's 1930s expansion plan included a requirement for a station to provide anti-submarine and anti-shipping patrols off the South-west coast of England. The site at St Eval was chosen as a Coastal Command airfield and work started in 1938. Five widely dispersed cottages, two houses and portions of two farms were acquired by compulsory purchase; the village of St Eval was completely demolished in order to build the airfield. Levelling of the site by G Wallace Ltd involved the removal by bulldozers of many Cornish hedges and three ancient tumuli.  One householder tried to hold out against the authorities and refused to leave his cottage for several days.  Only the church survived which the RAF adopted as their station church and it still stands today. The work progressed well and RAF St Eval opened on 2 October 1939.

Battle of Britain
In June 1940 St Eval became a Fighter Command sector headquarters during the Battle of Britain and Supermarine Spitfires were stationed there. These were joined by Hawker Hurricane and Bristol Blenheim fighters. The station's aircraft took an active part in the conflict.

Meteorological flights
The formation in December 1940 of No 404 (later 1404) Meteorological Flight was significant. The flight was tasked with providing basic weather data on which the Command meteorologists could base their forecasts. It was a role which St Eval performed throughout the war.

Attacks on St Eval
The presence of the Spitfires was not a great success as the Luftwaffe's change in tactics led to an increase in night raids for which the Spitfires were not suited. Therefore, 238 Squadron were posted in with Hurricanes. The airfield was hit a number of times in the summer of 1940 and early 1941. This caused considerable damage and casualties with the Germans carrying out further raids in May 1942, causing damage to buildings and the destruction of aircraft. St Eval was equipped with a green box barrage rocket device which sent a steel wire curtain into the air to descend on parachutes. This was intended to enmesh enemy aircraft and cause them to crash, but the device was unsuccessful.

Attack on the German battleship Gneisenau
On 6 April 1941 a small force of Beauforts from 22 Squadron, operating on detachment from St Eval, launched an attack on the German battleship Gneisenau in Brest harbour. A Beaufort was able to launch a torpedo at point blank range but was shot down. However, the ship was severely damaged below the water line, so was obliged to return to the dock for repair. The pilot of the Beaufort, Flying Officer Kenneth Campbell RAF, was posthumously awarded the Victoria Cross.

Attempted Irish defection

On 9 January 1942, a Supermarine Walrus of the Irish Air Corps was stolen from Rineanna airfield, Country Clair, by four Irish servicemen. Their intention was to fly to France to join the Luftwaffe. However, they were intercepted by RAF Spitfires and escorted to St Eval, where they landed and were detained by RAF Police. Subsequently, they and the aircraft were returned to Ireland.

No 61 Squadron
In the summer of 1942 No. 61 Squadron was twice loaned to Coastal Command for anti-submarine operations in the Bay of Biscay. It was detached from its station in Rutland to St Eval and on the very first occasion that it operated from there – on 17 July 1942 – a crew became the first in RAF Bomber Command to bring back irrefutable evidence that they had destroyed a U-boat at sea – a photograph showing the U-boat crew in the water swimming away from their sinking vessel.

American use of the airfield
To boost the anti-submarine forces and to gain experience in the role, the Americans began to use the airfield (as station 129) with Consolidated B-24 Liberator bombers of the 409th Bombardment Squadron (93d Bombardment Group), being deployed from RAF Alconbury in Huntingdonshire in October 1942.

The following month they were replaced by the 1st Antisubmarine Squadron being deployed from Langley Field, Virginia with the 2d Antisubmarine Squadron arriving in January 1943 forming the 1st Antisubmarine Group (Provisional) with specialized long-range Liberator bombers equipped with RADAR and other submarine detection equipment. From St. Eval, the squadrons flew killer hunts against German U-boats in the Bay of Biscay. Both of these squadrons were reassigned to Port Lyautey in French Morocco in March 1943 to shore up scanty Allied anti-submarine defences in the Atlantic approaches to the Straits of Gibraltar. German U-boats had very recently sunk four ships in an Allied convoy about a hundred miles off the coast of Portugal. Also, over the long term, the Allies wanted to increase air anti-submarine patrols and convoy coverage to secure their preparations for the impending Tunisian offensive and the subsequent invasion of Sicily.

The Army Air Forces Antisubmarine Command formed the 479th Antisubmarine Group at St Eval in July with four squadrons of Liberators to continue the antisubmarine campaign. The 479th's most effective antisubmarine patrols were conducted from 18 July to 2 August 1943, the period in which the group made nearly all of its attacks on the U-boats. After that time the Germans avoided surfacing during daylight and adopted a policy of evasion, but the group continued its patrols, often engaging Luftwaffe fighter interceptor aircraft.

This was once again a short-lived arrangement and the group took its Liberators to RAF Dunkeswell on 6 August, ending the American use of the station.

Loss of Whitley in submarine attack
On 20 June 1943, in the Bay of Biscay, one of a pair of Whitleys operated by 10 OTU from St. Eval was shot down while attacking a submarine believed to be the Barbarigo, of the Italian navy. All of the Whitley's crew were killed.

Accident at St Eval
In August 1943 a Whitley and Liberator collided on the runway. The Whitley caught fire which cooked the depth charges and caused a massive explosion and the loss of both the aircraft and crews. The collision was in part due to the poor runway layout, with a blind spot that hid one aircraft from the other.

1944 – The end of the war
The importance of St Eval was such that it was given a FIDO installation in early 1944 for dispersal of fog around the runway so that aircraft could land safely. St Eval was destined to have a busy time during the allied invasion of Europe.

It was home to three RAF Liberator squadrons (53, 224, 547). Many of these were equipped with the highly successful Leigh Light. In April, a fourth squadron arrived, giving the station one of the most powerful anti-submarine forces in the RAF. This force flew thousands of hours of patrols each month and was rewarded with a number of sightings, many of which were converted into attacks, with at least three confirmed U-boat kills in June alone.

The Allied capture of French ports meant that the U-boat threat was drastically reduced. This meant that the units posted to St Eval could be better used elsewhere and by the autumn of 1944 the airfield was a shadow of its former self.

Post World War II
The station continued to be used for maritime patrols and search and rescue duties. It was also a site for diversions with a number of military and commercial aircraft making use of St Eval due to bad weather at their destination airfield. The Station closed on 6 March 1959, with the existing squadrons moving to nearby RAF St. Mawgan. The airfield became home to the transmitters and aerial farm used for the low frequency communications used by the maritime Nimrods flying from RAF St Mawgan with the receiver site near RAF Mountbatten, Plymouth.

Current use
The site is home to a high frequency transmitter station forming part of the Defence High Frequency Communications Service. The station is operated by Babcock International Group on behalf of the Ministry of Defence.

Memorials
There are various memorials in St Ulvelus church, including a Book of Remembrance, a memorial window and a memorial to the crew of Shackleton VP254, who were killed in a crash off the Borneo coast on 9 December 1958.

A memorial tablet to the two crews of Shackletons WG531 and WL743 (squadron codes A-H and A-F respectively) of No.42 Squadron that probably collided whilst on an exercise off the Fastnet Rock on 11 January 1955, is displayed in St Columba's church, St Columb Major.

Units stationed at RAF St Eval

1939–1945

1945–1959

The following units were also here at some point:
 No. 67 Maintenance Unit RAF
 No. 2731 Squadron RAF Regiment
 No. 2738 Squadron RAF Regiment
 No. 2782 Squadron RAF Regiment
 Signals Development Unit RAF

See also

St Eval
Anti-submarine warfare

References

Citations

Bibliography
Airfield Focus - 7:St Eval by Chris Ashworth
The Military airfields of Britain, South-Western England
A Guide to Airfields of South Western England, Baron Jay Publishers

External links
Official RAF website
Atlantik Wall -  RAF St Eval

Military airbases established in 1938
Military history of Cornwall
Military installations closed in 1959
Royal Air Force stations in Cornwall
Royal Air Force stations of World War II in the United Kingdom